Coastal Carolina Regional Airport  is a commercial airport located three miles (5 km) southeast of the central business district of New Bern, a city in Craven County, North Carolina, United States. EWN covers 785 acres (318 ha) of land.

Coastal Carolina Regional Airport is the closest commercial airport to North Carolina's Outer Banks and Crystal Coast. The airport is the main connection to such Crystal Coast destinations as Cape Lookout National Seashore, Cape Hatteras National Seashore, the Outer Banks, Crystal Coast, Marine Corps Air Station Cherry Point, Atlantic Beach, North Carolina, various seasonal camps including Camp Sea Gull/Seafarer and Camp Don Lee, and Emerald Isle, North Carolina.

On July 10, 2008 the North Carolina General Assembly ratified a bill that allowed Craven County Regional Airport to change its name to Coastal Carolina Regional Airport. The name change became effective on August 15, 2008.

It is included in the Federal Aviation Administration (FAA) National Plan of Integrated Airport Systems for 2017–2021, in which it is categorized as a non-hub primary commercial service facility.

History
The airport was previously named Craven County Regional Airport, Simmons-Nott Airport, and New Bern Regional Airport. Simmons-Nott came from North Carolina Senator Furnifold McLendel Simmons who was present at the 1931 dedication of the new terminal. During an air performance for the dedication, United States Marine Corps First Lieutenant Joel Nott was killed. Senator Simmons required that 1stLt Nott's named be added to the airport to pay homage for the fallen military officer.

On August 8, 1941, the Marine Corps leased the airport to become an outlying field of Marine Corps Air Station Cherry Point and named it OLF Camp Mitchell. In the beginning of 1942, the Army Air Forces used the field for anti-submarine patrols. The field was later closed for seven months during 1942 while two hard surface runways and a runway lighting system were installed. The first Marine aviation units began to arrive at the field in February 1943. Among the units to train at the field during the war was Marine Aircraft Group 34 and fighter squadrons VMF-324 and VMF-511. In January 1944, plans were announced to expand the field. However, these plans were abandoned because the Marine Corps acquired surplus Army fields.

In 2011, Coast Carolina Regional Airport hosted three Honor Flights for World War II veterans.

Craven Regional Airport has previously been serviced by Midway Airlines, American Eagle, Piedmont Airlines, Charter Express, United Airlines, Delta Air Lines, Wheeler Airline, Henson Airlines and National Airlines.

Today, scheduled commercial flights tend to consist of four arrivals and four departures per day.

Terminal

Coastal Carolina Regional Airport currently has three gates for use by airlines, all of which are located on the central pier and share a common boarding area. The $17-million terminal for EWN was completed on November 5, 1999, by the LPA Group. As of June 2006, Coastal Carolina Regional has approved their 20-year master plan, which included an extension of the main runway, the runway safety area expansion, a larger noise zone, and a new control tower. Also located in the terminal are an eatery, named Triple Play Oasis Restaurant & Sports Bar, and several car rental agencies.  

Construction is slated to begin on a major terminal expansion in late 2022 or early 2023.  
The terminal project will increase the size of the facility by approximately 20% and include: new gates and dedicated airplane boarding bridges, a new terminal entrance canopy, an enhanced security screening checkpoint area, new modern restrooms, an extended baggage claim belt, an area for service animals, and many new energy efficient enhancements throughout. All are scheduled for completion by late summer 2024.

Airlines and destinations

Passenger

Cargo

Statistics

Top destinations

Delta Air Lines terminated service to EWN in July 2020.

Carrier shares

General aviation
Coastal Carolina Regional is in the top 10 of North Carolina's airports.  EWN is served by American Airlines and has general aviation. EWN is currently looking for additional airlines to provide additional air service due to eastern North Carolina.

For the 12-month period ending May 31, 2016, the airport had 35,109 aircraft operations, an average of 96 per day: 73% general aviation, 21% air taxi, 5% military, and <1% commercial. In May 2017, there were 85 aircraft based at this airport: 75 single-engine, 2 jet, and 3 helicopter.

General aviation provides most of the aircraft movements at EWN. The fixed-base operators at EWN are Tidewater Air, LLC and Tradewind International. A parachute jumping school is currently seeking approval to be based at EWN.

In August 2020, Coastal Carolina Regional Airport awarded a $5.8M contract to build a new Aircraft Rescue and Fire Fighting (ARFF) facility.

Accidents
On November 20, 1966, a Piedmont Airlines Martin 4-0-4 on a positioning flight crashed 3.1 miles (5 km) south of EWN on approach, colliding with trees and crashing into a wooded area. All three occupants were killed.

References

Books

External links
  (official site)
  at North Carolina DOT airport guide
 
 

1931 establishments in North Carolina
Airports established in 1931
Airports in North Carolina
Buildings and structures in New Bern, North Carolina
Transportation in Craven County, North Carolina